Senator Kerr may refer to:

Members of the United States Senate
Joseph Kerr (1765–1837), U.S. Senator from Ohio from 1814 to 1815
Robert S. Kerr (1896–1963), U.S. Senator from Oklahoma from 1949 to 1963

United States state senate members
Alice Forgy Kerr (born 1954), Kentucky State Senate
Andy Kerr (American politician) (born 1968), Colorado State Senate
James Kerr (Pennsylvania politician) (1851–1908), Pennsylvania State Senate
James Kerr (Texas politician) (1790–1850), Missouri State Senate
John H. Kerr III (1936–2015), North Carolina State Senate
John H. Kerr Jr. (1900–1968), North Carolina State Senate
John Leeds Kerr (1780–1844), Maryland State Senate
Lucien H. Kerr (1831–1873), Illinois State Senate
Sine Kerr (fl. 2010s), Arizona State Senate
Winfield S. Kerr (1852–1917), Ohio State Senate